"Husslin'" is a hip-hop song by Kardinal Offishall. It was the only single from his EP of the same name. The song also appears on his second album, Quest for Fire: Firestarter, Vol. 1. Released in early 2000, the 12" single quickly became an underground favorite, and it was #1 on many college radio charts in the U.S. After its release, radio-tracking publication Gavin Report called it "By far, the hottest 12-inch on the platter right now. With three cuts to choose from, you can't go wrong." The song has a catchy chorus and a powerful horn sample.

Music video
The music video was directed by Kevin De Freitas. In the video, Kardinal raps in the streets of Downtown Toronto alongside members of The Circle.

Track listing

12" single
A-side
 "Mic T.H.U.G.S." (Clean)
 "Mic T.H.U.G.S." (Dirty)
 "Mic T.H.U.G.S." (Instrumental)
 "U R Ghetto When" (Clean)

B-side
 "Husslin'" (Clean)
 "Husslin'" (Instrumental)
 "U R Ghetto When" (Dirty)
 "U R Ghetto When" (Instrumental)

Chart positions

References

External links
"Husslin'" music video

2000 singles
Kardinal Offishall songs
Songs written by Kardinal Offishall
1999 songs